Paul C. Yang is a Taiwanese-American mathematician specializing in differential geometry, partial differential equations and CR manifolds.  He is best known for his work in Conformal geometry for his study of extremal metrics and his research on scalar curvature and Q-curvature. In CR Geometry he is known for his work on the CR embedding problem, the CR Paneitz operator
and for introducing the Q' curvature in CR Geometry.

Career
Yang earned his doctorate at the University of California, Berkeley in 1973 under the supervision of Hung-Hsi Wu（() ）.
He held positions at Rice University, the University of Maryland, Indiana University and the
University of Southern California before joining
Princeton University in 2001.

Awards and honors

Yang was a Sloan Foundation Fellow in 1981.   In 2012, he
became a fellow of the American Mathematical Society.

Selected publications
J. Differential Geom. 27 (1988), no. 2, 259–296.
Acta Math. 159 (1987), no. 3–4, 215–259.
Chang, Sun-Yung A.; Yang, Paul C. Extremal metrics of zeta function determinants on 4-manifolds. Ann. of Math. (2) 142 (1995), no. 1, 171–212.
Chang, Sun-Yung A.; Gursky, Matthew J.; Yang, Paul C. The scalar curvature equation on 2- and 3-spheres. Calc. Var. Partial Differential Equations 1 (1993), no. 2, 205–229.
Chang, Sun-Yung A.; Gursky, Matthew J.; Yang, Paul C. An equation of Monge-Ampère type in conformal geometry, and four-manifolds of positive Ricci curvature. Ann. of Math. (2) 155 (2002), no. 3, 709–787.
Yang, Paul C.; Yau, Shing-Tung Eigenvalues of the Laplacian of compact Riemann surfaces and minimal submanifolds. Ann. Scuola Norm. Sup. Pisa Cl. Sci. (4) 7 (1980), no. 1, 55–63.
Chanillo, Sagun; Chiu, Hung-Lin; Yang, Paul C. Embeddability for Three Dimensional Cauchy-Riemann Manifolds and CR Yamabe Invariants, Duke Math. J.,161(15), (2012), 2909–2921.

References

Living people
20th-century American mathematicians
21st-century American mathematicians
Fellows of the American Mathematical Society
University of California, Berkeley alumni
Rice University faculty
University of Maryland, College Park faculty
Indiana University faculty
University of Southern California faculty
Princeton University faculty
American people of Chinese descent
Differential geometers
Chinese mathematicians
Year of birth missing (living people)
People from Changhua County